The Focke-Achgelis Fa 330 Bachstelze was a type of rotary-wing kite, known as a rotor kite. They were towed behind German U-boats during World War II to allow a lookout to see further.

Development 
Because of their low profile in the water, submarines could not see more than a few miles over the ocean. To solve this, the German admiralty considered a number of different options, including a folding seaplane (Arado Ar 231). In the end, they chose the Fa 330, a simple, single-seat autogyro kite with a three-bladed rotor.

The Fa 330 could be deployed to the deck of the submarine by two people and was tethered to the U-boat by a  cable. The airflow on the rotors as the boat motored along on the surface would spin them up. If the U-boat captain were forced to abandon it on the surface, the tether would be released and the Fa 330 would descend slowly to the water.

When not in use, the Fa 330 was stowed in two watertight compartments aft of the conning tower. In calm weather and sea, the assembly and disassembly steps could each be completed in approximately four minutes. In heavier weather, recovering (winching the Fa 330 back to the deck), dismantling, and stowing the Fa 330 took approximately 20 minutes and was a difficult operation.

Focke-Achgelis proposed a powered version of the Fa 330, the Fa 336, but the design never made it to the hardware phase.

Operational history 

As Allied air cover in other theatres of the war was considered too much of a threat, only U-boats operating in the far southern parts of the Atlantic and the Indian Ocean used the Fa 330. Despite its advantages, the use of the Fa 330 resulted in only a single sinking when  used one to spot, intercept and sink the Greek steamer Efthalia Mari on 6 August 1943.

The Allies came into possession of an Fa 330 in May 1944 when they captured the  intact. After the war, the British government did successful experiments towing Fa 330s behind ships and jeeps, but the development of the helicopter quickly occupied the attention of the military.

U-boats that deployed Fa 330 kites included at least U-177, and U-852. Otto Giese wrote, "Our boat was rigged with a Bachstelze. This was a small, single, piloted helicopter attached to a long steel cable and lifted into the air by the speed of the boat while the cable was gradually reeled out. From his position aloft, the pilot had a 360-degree view and could report any vessels."

Legacy and influence
The Fa 330 directly inspired Igor Bensen's interest in small autogyros which culminated in the Bensen B-8 and other modern autogyros.

In February 2013, Aviation Week and Space Technology reported that L-3 Communications was testing its Valkyrie, an unpowered, tethered autogyro that weighs , which is intended to serve as a cheap alternative to a shipborne helicopter. L-3 stated that naval vessels could easily be retrofitted with this system.

Surviving aircraft

Denmark 
100032 – On static display at Egeskov Castle in Kvaerndrup, Faaborg-Midtfyn.

France 
100150 – On static display at the Le musée de l'Air et de l'Espace in Paris. This airframe was restored using parts from Wk. Nr. 100115 or Wk. Nr. 100145.

Germany 
100042 – On static display at the Deutsches Museum in Munich.
100345 – On static display at the Deutsches Technikmuseum in Berlin.
100406 – On static display at the Hubschraubermuseum Bückeburg in Bückeburg.

United Kingdom 
100143 – On static display at the Imperial War Museum Duxford in Duxford.
100503 – On static display at the RAF Museum Cosford in Cosford.
100509 – On static display at the Science Museum at Wroughton in Swindon.
100545 – On static display at the Fleet Air Arm Museum in Ilchester.
100549 – Awaiting restoration at the Lashenden Air Warfare Museum in Ashford.

United States 
60133 – On static display at the Steven F. Udvar-Hazy Center in Chantilly, Virginia.
100463 – On static display at the National Museum of the United States Air Force in Dayton, Ohio.

Specifications

See also 
Hafner Rotabuggy
Man-lifting kite
Petróczy-Kármán-Žurovec tethered helicopters

References

External links 

 The FA 330 at NASM

 "German Submarine-Borne Observation Rotor-Kite", Allied Intelligence Report
 Video of the assembly and operation of a Focke-Achgelis Fa 330 aboard a German U-boat on YouTube

Focke-Achgelis aircraft
1940s German military reconnaissance aircraft
Rotor kites
Submarine-borne aircraft